Structured Audio Orchestra Language (SAOL) is an imperative, MUSIC-N programming language designed for describing virtual instruments, processing digital audio, and applying sound effects. It was published as subpart 5 of MPEG-4 Part 3 (ISO/IEC 14496-3:1999) in 1999.

As part of the MPEG-4 international standard, SAOL is one of the key components of the MPEG-4 Structured Audio toolset, along with:

 Structured Audio Score Language (SASL)
 Structured Audio Sample Bank Format (SASBF)
 The MPEG-4 SA scheduler
 MIDI support

See also
 Csound
 MPEG-4 Structured Audio

References

 The MPEG-4 Structured Audio Standard

External links
 SAOL.net - MPEG4 structured audio (mp4-sa)

Audio programming languages
MPEG